Homewood is a borough in northern Beaver County, Pennsylvania, United States. The population was 104 at the 2020 census. It is a part of the Pittsburgh metropolitan area.

Geography

Homewood is located in northern Beaver County at  (40.813995, -80.329852). It is entirely surrounded by the borough of Big Beaver. The Pennsylvania Turnpike (Interstate 76) passes through the northeast corner of the borough, with Exit 13 (Pennsylvania Route 18/Big Beaver Boulevard) located just outside the borough limits. PA-18 runs through the eastern edge of the borough.

The borough has a waterfall within the community, which was named Buttermilk Falls in the year 1870. The waters fall into a natural basin of solid sandstone. The town lends its name to the Homewood Formation, the sandstone rock layer which is exposed at Buttermilk Falls. The Homewood Formation is the upper member of the Pottsville Group (Wanless, 1939).

Homewood is drained by Clarks Run, which flows into the Beaver River a short distance to the east.

Demographics

As of the census of 2000, there were 147 people, 59 households, and 37 families residing in the borough. The population density was 855.1 people per square mile (333.9/km2). There were 62 housing units at an average density of 360.7 per square mile (140.8/km2). The racial makeup of the borough was 94.56% White, 2.04% African American, and 3.40% Native American.

There were 59 households, out of which 15.3% had children under the age of 18 living with them, 47.5% were married couples living together, 10.2% had a female householder with no husband present, and 35.6% were non-families. 28.8% of all households were made up of individuals, and 8.5% had someone living alone who was 65 years of age or older. The average household size was 2.49 and the average family size was 3.08.

In the borough the population was spread out, with 15.0% under the age of 18, 13.6% from 18 to 24, 26.5% from 25 to 44, 27.9% from 45 to 64, and 17.0% who were 65 years of age or older. The median age was 42 years. For every 100 females, there were 96.0 males. For every 100 females age 18 and over, there were 101.6 males.

The median income for a household in the borough was $33,333, and the median income for a family was $52,500. Males had a median income of $31,250 versus $20,357 for females. The per capita income for the borough was $34,486. There were 4.5% of families and 9.0% of the population living below the poverty line, including no under eighteens and 16.0% of those over 64.

Education
Children in Homewood are served by the Big Beaver Falls Area School District. The current schools serving Homewood are:
 Big Beaver Elementary School –  grades K-5
 Beaver Falls Middle School – grades 6-8
 Beaver Falls High School – grades 9-12

References

Populated places established in 1859
Pittsburgh metropolitan area
Boroughs in Beaver County, Pennsylvania
1859 establishments in Pennsylvania